Børge Nielsen may refer to:

 Børge Nielsen (gymnast) (born 1924), Danish Olympic gymnast
 Børge Raahauge Nielsen (1920–2010), Danish rower
 Børge Saxil Nielsen (1920–1977), Danish cyclist
 Børge Nielsen (motorcyclist)